Anar Mammadli (born 1978 in Yevlakh) is a prominent human rights activist in Azerbaijan. He is active in observing and monitoring elections, and he has repeatedly criticized the conduct of elections by Azerbaijani authorities. On 16 December 2013, Mammadli was arrested and jailed, following outspoken criticism of presidential elections in October 2013. In spite of international protests, Mammadli was sentenced to more than 5 years in jail in May 2014. On 29 September 2014, while still in detention, Mammadli was awarded the Václav Havel Human Rights Prize by the Parliamentary Assembly of the Council of Europe, which honours "outstanding" action in defence of human rights.

Activism
Mammadli began his activism in the late 1990s. In 1997 he established the Secular Progress Youth Organization together with Bashir Suleymanli and other young co-founders. In 2001, Anar Mammadli participated in setting up the Election Monitoring Center. Five months before the Azerbaijani Presidential Elections in 2008, the registration of this organization was cancelled by the Khatai District Court on 14 May 2008 based on a technicality in official filings. In response, Anar Mammadli and Bashir Suleymanli established the Election Monitoring and Democracy Studies Center (EMDS) in December 2008.

Mammadli's organization is a member of the European Network of Election Monitoring Organizations (ENEMO), European Platform for Democratic Elections (EPDE), Network of Parliament Monitoring Organizations and the Civil Society Forum of the Eastern Partnership Program of the European Union, and Mammadli participated in numerous election observations internationally.

In addition to his activism, Mammadli has worked as a journalist, holding a variety of positions as newspaper reporter, commentator, editor and assistant to the editor in chief at “Merkez”("Center"), “Hurriyet” ("Freedom"), and “Bugün” ("Today"), from 1998 to 2002.

Mammadli is a graduate from the Azerbaijan University of Languages.

Arrest
After vocal criticism of the presidential elections held on 9 October 2013, the EMDS found itself under increasing pressure. In its report on the elections, the EMDS had highlighted a series of irregularities, saying that conditions for a free and democratic vote had not been met.

Shortly after EMDS published its report, the General Prosecutor's Office of the Republic of Azerbaijan opened a criminal case against Mammadli and he was arrested on 16 December 2013. On 26 May 2014, Mammadli was sentenced to 5 years and 6 months by the decision of Baku Grave Crimes Court. Mammadli was charged with illegal entrepreneurship, tax evasion, abuse of official authority to influence on the results of election, charges rejected by Mammadli and his lawyers. The trial and sentence was criticized by many international organizations and human rights groups. Amnesty International considers Anar Mammadli a prisoner of conscience, and a number of countries have called for his release.

In September 2014, Mammadli was awarded the Václav Havel Human Rights Prize by the Parliamentary Assembly of the Council of Europe (PACE). With this award, the Council of Europe wants to honour "outstanding civil society action in defence of human rights".

On 17 March 2016, after almost 2.5 years in prison, Anar Mammadli was pardoned by the president of Azerbaijan, along with a number of high profile political prisoners.

References

External links 
 Network of Parliament Monitoring Organizations and the Civil Society Forum of the Eastern Partnership Program of the European Union 
 OSCE
 European Platform for Democratic Elections (EPDE)

1978 births
Azerbaijani prisoners and detainees
Living people
Azerbaijani human rights activists
People from Yevlakh
Amnesty International prisoners of conscience held by Azerbaijan